HaGoshrim is a kibbutz in the Galilee Panhandle in northern Israel, 5 km east of Kiryat Shmona. The kibbutz is adjacent to the Hurshat Tal National Park and bisected by tributaries of the Jordan River, the Snir (Hatsbani), Koren, itself a tributary of the Dan and Tal.

History
Kibbutz HaGoshrim was founded in 1948 mostly by Jewish immigrants from Turkey. The kibbutz was established partly on the lands of the depopulated Palestinian village of al-Khisas. The kibbutz opened a hotel in the manor house of Emir Faour, chief of the al-Fadel tribe, for whom the villagers worked as tenant farmers.

Economy
The chief economic branches are agriculture and tourism. The kibbutz also owns Mepro, which manufactures carpenters' levels and military optics, and the Epilady company, established in 1986. Epilady is a hand-held device developed by two Israeli engineers that revolutionized hair removal.

Archaeology
Excavations at the Neolithic site of Hagoshrim in 2003 yielded a large assemblage of skeletal fragments, mainly of cattle and pigs, providing evidence of the domestication of these taxa in the southern Levant.

References

External links
Official website of the Kibbutz 
Hagoshrim Hotel  Website (in Hebrew)
Hagoshrim Hotel  Website 
Galilee Guide 

Kibbutzim
Kibbutz Movement
Populated places established in 1948
1948 establishments in Israel
Populated places in Northern District (Israel)
Turkish-Jewish culture in Israel